A naturally aspirated engine, also known as a normally aspirated engine, and abbreviated to N/A or NA, is an internal combustion engine in which air intake depends solely on atmospheric pressure and does not have forced induction through a turbocharger or a supercharger.

Description 
In a naturally aspirated engine, air for combustion (Diesel cycle in a Diesel engine or specific types of Otto cycle in petrol engines, namely petrol direct injection) or an air/fuel mixture (traditional Otto cycle petrol engines), is drawn into the engine's cylinders by atmospheric pressure acting against a partial vacuum that occurs as the piston travels downwards toward bottom dead centre during the intake stroke. Owing to innate restriction in the engine's inlet tract, which includes the intake manifold, a small pressure drop occurs as air is drawn in, resulting in a volumetric efficiency of less than 100 percent—and a less than complete air charge in the cylinder. The density of the air charge, and therefore the engine's maximum theoretical power output, in addition to being influenced by induction system restriction, is also affected by engine speed and atmospheric pressure, the latter of which decreases as the operating altitude increases.

This is in contrast to a forced-induction engine, in which a mechanically driven supercharger or an exhaust-driven turbocharger is employed to facilitate increasing the mass of intake air beyond what could be produced by atmospheric pressure alone. Nitrous oxide can also be used to artificially increase the mass of oxygen present in the intake air. This is accomplished by injecting liquid nitrous oxide into the intake, which supplies significantly more oxygen in a given volume than is possible with atmospheric air. Nitrous oxide is 36.3% available oxygen by mass after it decomposes as compared with atmospheric air at 20.95%.

As a two-stroke Diesel engine is incapable of this natural aspiration, some method of charging the cylinders with scavenging air must be integrated into the engine design. This is usually achieved with a positive displacement blower driven by the crankshaft. The blower does not act as a supercharger in this application, as it is sized to produce a volume of air flow that is in direct proportion to engine's requirement for combustion, at a given power and speed. By the Society of Automotive Engineer's definition, a mechanically scavenged two-stroke diesel engine is considered to be naturally aspirated.

Applications 
Most automobile petrol engines, as well as many small engines used for non-automotive purposes, are naturally aspirated. Most modern diesel engines powering highway vehicles are turbocharged to produce a more favourable power-to-weight ratio, a higher torque curve, as well as better fuel efficiency and lower exhaust emissions. Turbocharging is nearly universal on diesel engines that are used in railroad, marine engines, and commercial stationary applications (electrical power generation, for example). Forced induction is also used with reciprocating aircraft engines to negate some of the power loss that occurs as the aircraft climbs to higher altitudes.

Advantages and disadvantages 
The advantages and disadvantages of a naturally aspirated engine in relation to a same-sized engine relying on forced induction include:

Advantages
 Easier to maintain and repair 
 Lower development and production costs
 Increased reliability, partly due to fewer separate, moving parts
 More direct throttle response (due to the lack of turbo lag)
 Less potential for overheating

Disadvantages
 Decreased efficiency 
 Decreased power-to-weight ratio
 Decreased potential for tuning
 Increased power loss at higher elevation (due to lower air pressure) compared to forced induction engines

See also 
Carburetor
Fuel injection
Manifold vacuum

References 

Engine technology
Internal combustion engine